Crestone may refer to:
Crestone (Macedonia), a town of ancient Macedonia, Greece
Crestone, Colorado, a town in Saguache County
Crestone Needle, a mountain peak in Colorado
Crestone Peak, the seventh highest peak in Colorado
The Crestones, four peaks in Colorado
 Crestone (album), a 2007 album by the Paul Winter Consort

See also
Creston (disambiguation)